XAP might refer to:

XAP processor, a CPU architecture for computers, developed by Cambridge Consultants since 1994
 XAP (Extensible Authoring Publishing), an old name for Extensible Metadata Platform (XMP)
XAP (file format), container format for mobile apps and Silverlight web apps
XAP, The IATA airport code for Chapecó Airport
xAP Home Automation protocol
XAP, The ICAO Code for Midway Connection, operated by Fischer Brothers Aviation of the United States